Akera is a marine genus of sea hare in the family Akeridae, known from the late Callovian (Jurassic) to the recent periods.

Description
Akera is a primitive genus. These sea hares do not fit completely in their external shell; it just covers their visceral hump which is positioned at the posterior end of their bodies. Their streamlined bodies are adapted for burrowing.

Species 
 Akera bayeri (Marcus & Marcus, 1967) - It can be found along the coast of Colombia and Brazil. 
 Akera bullata (O. F. Müller, 1776) - type species
 Akera julieae Valdes & Barwick, 2005
 Akera silbo Ortea & Moro, 2009
 Akera soluta (Gmelin, 1791) - Also called the Solute akera, this species can be found in the Indo-West Pacific. Little is known about this species. Its shell can grow as large as 45 mm in length.
 † Akera striatella Lamarck, 1804 - fossil from the Eocene and Oligocene.
 Akera tasmanica Beddome, 1883: synonym of Diaphana tasmanica (Beddome, 1883)

References

External links
 Akeroidea at Sea Slug Forum showing Akera soluta
 Akera soluta at Sea Slug Forum
 Akera bullata

Akeridae
Callovian first appearances
Extant Middle Jurassic first appearances